Bossiaea modesta is a species of flowering plant in the family Fabaceae and is endemic to the ranges east of Perth in Western Australia. It is a sub-shrub with wiry, trailing to twining stems, linear to elliptic or oblong leaves, and small yellow and red flowers.

Description
Bossiaea modesta is a sub-shrub that typically grows to a height of up to  when supported by other plants, and has wiry, trailing and twining stems. Flowering occurs from October to December.

Taxonomy and naming
Bossiaea modesta was first formally described in 1994 by James Henderson Ross in the journal Muelleria from specimens collected by Margaret Corrick in the Mount Dale area in 1983. The specific epithet (modesta) means "modest" or "unassuming".

Distribution and habitat
This bossiaea grows in damp places near Mount Dale and on the Darling Range to the east and south east of Perth in the Jarrah Forest and Swan Coastal Plain biogeographic regions.

Conservation status
Bossiaea modesta is classified as "Priority Two" by the Western Australian Government Department of Parks and Wildlife, meaning that it is poorly known and from only one or a few locations.

References

modesta
Mirbelioids
Flora of Western Australia
Plants described in 1994